Austroplebeia essingtoni is a small eusocial stingless bee first described by Cockerell in 1905  and it is found in Australia (Northern areas of Western Australia and Northern Territory). They are one of the smallest stingless bees in Australia  and can survive in very arid areas with annual rainfalls down to 300 mm.

Etymology 
The name 'essingtoni' was given because the first specimens were collected from Port Essington on the north coast of Arnhem Land, Australia in 1840.

Description and identification 
The workers (3.2-3.9mm) usually have distinct cream bands on the side and rear of the thorax and broad cream marking on the lower face. Most workers are noticeably smaller than those of the other Austroplebeia species across their distribution. Their colouring varies, workers in the Hamersley Ranges are brighter, with pale yellow bands on the thorax, legs and abdomen as well as bright patterns on the lower face. Other populations in contrast, such as the ones in coastal areas,  are much darker. Males from this species are brightly coloured and have unusual bent tips on their genitalia.

Nest building 
A. essingtoni usually nests in small to medium hollow trees (9–30 cm diameter at nest level) but many nest in wall cavities or crevices in cliffs. Similar to A. cassiae and A. magna, A. essingtoni builds a short nest entrance tunnel. The cells in the broods are loosely connected together into an irregular structure called a "cluster". The pollen and honey is stored in spherical or oval shaped pots with thin walls.

Human use 
Preliminary attempts to establish this species in hives have been successful but propagation by division has not achieved much success.

References

Apidae
Hymenoptera of Australia
Species described in 1905